Madison Bianca Parks (born November 14, 1993) is a Canadian freestyle wrestler. She won the silver medal in the women's 50 kg event at the 2022 Commonwealth Games held in Birmingham, England. She also won the silver medal in the women's 50 kg event at the 2022 Pan American Wrestling Championships held in Acapulco, Mexico.

Career 

She competed in the women's 50 kg event at the 2020 Pan American Wrestling Championships held in Ottawa, Canada. In 2021, she lost her bronze medal match in the women's 50 kg event at the 2021 Pan American Wrestling Championships held in Guatemala City, Guatemala. A few months later, she was eliminated in her second match in the women's 50 kg event at the World Wrestling Championships held in Oslo, Norway.

In 2022, she won the gold medal in her event at the Matteo Pellicone Ranking Series 2022 held in Rome, Italy. She competed in the 50kg event at the 2022 World Wrestling Championships held in Belgrade, Serbia.

Achievements

References

External links 
 

Living people
1993 births
Place of birth missing (living people)
Canadian female sport wrestlers
Pan American Wrestling Championships medalists
Wrestlers at the 2022 Commonwealth Games
Commonwealth Games silver medallists for Canada
Commonwealth Games medallists in wrestling
21st-century Canadian women
Medallists at the 2022 Commonwealth Games